Jagan Graeme Hames (born 31 October 1975) is a retired decathlete from Australia, who won the gold medal at the 1998 Commonwealth Games in Kuala Lumpur, Malaysia, setting a personal best (8,490 points). He started his career as a high jumper and has an official PB of 2.30m in this event.

Achievements

References

 Jagan Hames at Australian Athletics Historical Results

External links 
 
 

1975 births
Living people
Australian decathletes
Australian male high jumpers
Athletes (track and field) at the 1994 Commonwealth Games
Athletes (track and field) at the 1998 Commonwealth Games
Commonwealth Games gold medallists for Australia
Commonwealth Games medallists in athletics
Medallists at the 1998 Commonwealth Games